Lyubov, Liubov or Lubov is a female given name, meaning “love”. It is of Slavic origin, coming from the basic word l'ub.

Variants
 Russian: Любовь (Lyubov, Liubov, Lubov), Люба (Lyuba, Liuba, Luba)
 Ukrainian: Любов, Люба
 Belarusian: Любоў, Люба

People

Lyubov 
Lyubov Dostoyevskaya, Russian writer, daughter of Fyodor Dostoyevsky
 Lyubov Golanchikova, Russian pilot
 Lyubov Kremlyova, Russian athlete
 Lyubov Orlova, Russian actress
Lyubov Popova, Russian avant-garde artist
Lyubov Savelyeva (born 1940), Russian glass artist
Lyubov Eduardovna Sobol, (born  1987), Russian political  figure,  a lawyer of the Anti-Corruption Foundation
 Lyubov Sirota, Ukrainian journalist and writer
 Lyubov S. Sokolova, Russian actress
 Lyubov V. Sokolova, Russian volleyball player
Lyubov Sova, Russian philologist
 Lyubov Uspenskaya, American singer of Russian/Ukrainian origin

Liubov 
 Liubov Charkashyna (born 1987), retired Belarusian individual rhythmic gymnast
 Liubov Efimenko (born 1999), Finnish figure skater
 Liubov Gurevich (1866–1940), Russian editor, translator, author, and critic
 Liubov Ilyushechkina (born 1991), Russian-born Canadian pair skater
 Liubov Nikitina (born 1999), Russian freestyle skier who competes internationally
 Liubov Sereda (born 1945), retired Soviet rhythmic gymnast
 Liubov Sheremeta (born 1980), Ukrainian former artistic gymnast
 Liubov Yaskevich (born 1985), Russian female sport shooter

Lubov 
 Lubov Azria, American fashion designer of Ukrainian origin
 Lubov Bakirova, Russian pair skater
 Lubov Gazov, Austrian aerobic gymnast of Bulgarian origin
 Lubov Rabinovich, Russian painter
 Lubov Roudenko, French-American ballet dancer and fashion designer of Russian/Bulgarian origin
 Lubov Tchernicheva, Russian ballet dancer
 Lubov Volosova, Russian wrestler
 Lubov Zsiltzova-Lisenko, Ukrainian chess player
 Lubov (painter), Russian science fiction and fantasy artist

See also
 Luba (given name)
Ljubica (name)
Ljubomir (given name)
 Ljupka
 Love (given name)
 Liubov i golubi or Love and Pigeons (Russian: Любовь и голуби, transliterated)

References

External links 
Lyubov at Behind the Name
City of Brides -> Names of Russian Women

Slavic feminine given names
Feminine given names
Russian feminine given names
Ukrainian feminine given names